Raszków is a town in Greater Poland Voivodeship (west-central Poland).

Raszków may also refer to:

Raszków, Lower Silesian Voivodeship (south-west Poland)
Raszków, Świętokrzyskie Voivodeship (south-central Poland)

See also 
 Rașcov
 Rashkov
 Raszów (disambiguation)